Belle Island is a river island in Wood County, Wisconsin.

Former variant names were Neeve's Island and Mead Island, after former owners George Neeves and George Mead, respectively. The present name "Belle Island" is commendatory.

References

Landforms of Wood County, Wisconsin
River islands of Wisconsin